The West Hills Mall is a shopping centre located at Dukonah, near Weija along the Accra – Cape Coast Highway in the  Greater Accra Region of Ghana.

History 
The West Hills Mall which was opened on 30 October 2014. It is jointly owned by Delico Property Development Limited (60 percent) and Ghana's Social Security and National Insurance Trust (SSNIT) (40 percent).

References

Buildings and structures in Accra
Shopping malls established in 2014
Shopping malls in Ghana
2014 establishments in Ghana